Joshua Hagerty (born July 27, 1998) is a professional Canadian football defensive back for the Toronto Argonauts of the Canadian Football League (CFL).

University career
Hagerty played U Sports football for the Saskatchewan Huskies from 2016 to 2020, while taking a redshirt year in 2016. He played in 26 regular season games where he had 72 tackles, four interceptions, one forced fumble, and one fumble recovery. Hagerty was a member of the 2018 Hardy Cup champion Huskies where he intercepted Adam Sinagra on the Calgary Dinos' first offensive play. He did not play in 2020 due to the cancellation of the 2020 U Sports football season and remained draft-eligible for the Canadian Football League in 2021.

Professional career
Hagerty was drafted in the sixth round, 47th overall, in the 2021 CFL Draft by the Toronto Argonauts and signed with the team on May 13, 2021. He made the team following training camp and played in his first career professional game on August 7, 2021, against the Calgary Stampeders. After his teammate, Crezdon Butler, suffered a concussion, Hagerty made his first career start, at safety, on September 10, 2021, against the Hamilton Tiger-Cats, where he recorded the first four defensive tackles of his career.

Personal life
Hagerty's father, Jeff, also played football for the Saskatchewan Huskies and won a Vanier Cup with the team in 1990.

References

External links
Toronto Argonauts bio 

1998 births
Living people
Canadian football defensive backs
Saskatchewan Huskies football players
Players of Canadian football from Saskatchewan
Sportspeople from Regina, Saskatchewan
Toronto Argonauts players